Princess Anastasia may refer to:

People 
Grand Duchess Anastasia Nikolaevna of Russia (1901–1918), the most famous Anastasia of Russia
Princess Anastasia of Georgia (1763–1838)
Princess Anastasia of Greece and Denmark (1878–1923)
Princess Anastasia of Montenegro (1868–1935)
Princess Anastasia of Prussia (born 1944)

Other meanings 
SPL Princess Anastasia (1986), cruiseferry

See also
 Anastasia (disambiguation)